Keith O'Quinn is an American football coach. He is the former special teams coordinator for the Dallas Cowboys of the National Football League (NFL).

Early years
O’Quinn was born in San Antonio, Texas. He played the strong safety position on the football team at the University of North Texas, playing under Jeff Ireland in 1992 and 1993. O'Quinn earned a bachelor’s of science degree at the University of North Texas and went on to earn a master’s degree in counseling and human development from Hardin-Simmons University.

Coaching career

Dallas Cowboys
In 2010, O'Quinn was hired by the Dallas Cowboys as an offensive quality control coach, a position he would serve for four seasons. In 2014, he was promoted to the assistant special teams coach. In 2018, O'Quinn was promoted to special teams coordinator.

Personal life
O’Quinn and his wife, Reigan, have three children, Mysti, Brittney and Brock.

References 

North Texas Mean Green football players
Dallas Cowboys coaches
Dallas Cowboys scouts
Sportspeople from San Antonio
University of North Texas alumni
Year of birth missing (living people)
Living people
Players of American football from San Antonio